HMS Exmouth was a Royal Navy anti-submarine warfare frigate of the  or Type 14 class.

Service history
Exmouth became the first major British warship to be powered by gas turbine engines alone when, in 1966, she was taken in hand and was refitted with a combined gas or gas (COGOG) arrangement. The main reason behind the conversion of Exmouth was to trial the (then) new Marine Olympus which had been selected as the turbine for the Type 82 destroyer and the Type 19 high-speed anti-submarine frigate. Therefore, she was fitted with a Bristol Siddeley Olympus TM1 of 24,000 shp (limited to  due to gearbox and shaft limitations) for full power and two Bristol Siddeley Proteus 10M (3,500 shp each) for fuel-efficient cruising. These engines drove the single shaft through a common gearbox. The Proteus engines could work alone or together, but could not be run together with the Olympus. As the engines could not run in reverse, a reversible-pitch propeller was installed. As the engines could be controlled directly from throttles on the bridge, bridge steering was fitted. The requisite air intakes and filters were grouped amidships and the turbine uptakes exhausted into a common, streamlined funnel, completely changing Exmouths appearance. The exhaust and intake trunking was also utilised to allow the removal of complete engines, giving a rapid 24-hour exchange time.

Exmouth rejoined the fleet on 5 June 1968, and during the 1970s she carried out extended trials to validate the feasibility of all-gas turbine propulsion. The foresight of her conversion was illustrated when after only 64 hours of running, an entire ring of Olympus turbine blades failed. Her test cruises took her to the Mediterranean Sea, where she took part in various trials and exercises based at Malta. She proceeded to Crete which made her the only Type 14 to get this far east. She acted as plane guard for the aircraft carrier  and was involved in the search for survivors when a Russian destroyer lost 3 men overboard when making a close pass ahead of Ark Royal whilst the latter was at flying stations (the men were never found). She eventually returned to her home base port of Chatham in Kent. She then went to the Isle of Portland as a day runner in the 2nd Frigate Squadron, providing support for ships working-up under Flag Officer Sea Training. This was to prove her propulsion in a stop/start scenario – basically press the button, start the engines and sail – which was much less time-consuming than flashing up a steam plant.

The trials were ultimately successful, and allowed the trouble-free introduction of the Olympus into naval service in the Type 42 destroyer and the Type 21 and two batches of Type 22 frigates. The Olympus was also an export success, and Exmouths COGOG arrangement was also widely emulated. Exmouth was broken up in 1979.

References

The Blackwood class, Type 14 Second Rate Frigates, George Moore, in Warship 2001–2002, Conway Maritime Press, 2001,

Publications

 

1955 ships
Blackwood-class frigates
Experimental ships
Ships of the Fishery Protection Squadron of the United Kingdom